Jürgen Schneider (born 19 December 1949) is a Swiss former cyclist. He competed in the team pursuit at the 1968 Summer Olympics.

References

External links
 

1949 births
Living people
Swiss male cyclists
Olympic cyclists of Switzerland
Cyclists at the 1968 Summer Olympics
Cyclists from Bern